Ena or ENA may refer to:

Education
 École nationale d'administration, French Grande école, for civil service
 Education Networks of America, Internet service provider

Fictional characters
 Ena Sharples, from the British soap opera Coronation Street
 Ena Shinonome, from the Japanese video game Hatsune Miku: Colorful Stage!
 Aunt Ena, from the book Bambi, a Life in the Woods
 ENA, main character of the animation series of the same name

Government and politics 
 English National Association, a former political party
 Ensame Nacionalista Astur, a defunct political party in Spain
 Ethiopian News Agency, of the Government of Ethiopia
 Étoile Nord-Africaine (The North African Star), a former Algerian nationalist organization

People

Given name or nickname 
 Ena von Baer (born 1974), Chilean journalist, political scientist and senator
 Ena Baga (1906–2004), British pianist and theatre organist
 Ena Begović (1960–2000), Croatian actress
 Ena Sandra Causevic (born 1989), Danish model
 Ena Cremona (born 1936), Maltese judge at the European Union General Court
 Ena de Silva (1922–2015), Sri Lankan artist
 Ena Fujita (born 1990), Japanese musician and model
 Ena Gregory (1906–1993), Australian motion picture actress
 Ena Guevara (born 1959), Peruvian long-distance runner
 Ena Kadic (1989–2015), Bosnian-Austrian model and beauty pageant titleholder
 Ena Murray (1936–2015), Afrikaans writer
 Ena Noël (1910–2003), Australian dancer, teacher, librarian and advocate for children's literature
 Ena Lamont Stewart (1912–2006), Scottish playwright
 Ena Lucía Portela (born 1972), Cuban writer
 Ena Saha (born 1991), Indian actress
 Ena Shibahara (born 1998), American tennis player
 Ena Stockley (1906–1989), New Zealand swimmer
 Ena Swansea (born 1966), American artist
 Ena Thomas (1935–2020), Welsh television chef
 Ena Twigg (1847–1920), British psychic medium
 Paul Kostabi (born 1962), American artist, musician, and producer
 Victoria Eugenie of Battenberg (1887–1969), Queen of Spain

Surname 
 Justin Ena (born 1977), American football player
 Rav Ena (died 540), Jewish Savora sage

Places
 Ena District, Gifu (ceased 2005), a former district in Japan
 Ena, Gifu (formed 2004), a city in Japan
 Ena, Gujarat, a village in India
 Ena Lake, Ontario, Canada
Ena Lake (Saskatchewan), Canada
 Mount Ena, in Japan

Science and technology
 Ena (gastropod), a genus of land snails
 Extractable nuclear antigen
 Energetic neutral atom
 European Nucleotide Archive

Transportation
 Ena Railway, in Japan; defunct
 Ena Station, a railway station in Ena, Japan
 Kenai Municipal Airport in Alaska, United States
 SB Ena, a 1906 wooden Thames sailing barge

ST Ena, a Greek tugboat
SY Ena, an Australian steam yacht

Other uses
 Ena (album), a 2006 album by Greek artist Peggy Zina
 ENA Channel, a Greek television channel
 ENA (South Korean TV channel), a South Korean commercial general entertainment channel
 Apali language
 Emergency Nurses Association
 Energy Networks Australia, a trade association
 Energy Networks Association (United Kingdom), a trade association
 European NAvigator, an educational website
 Experimental Negotiation Agreement (1974–1984), a United Steelworkers agreement with U.S. Steel and other steelmakers